Akuluto is a town and Subdivision in the Zünheboto District of Nagaland, India. There are a total of 10 villages under Akuluto Subdivision. According to 2011 census of India, there are a total of 6,612 people living in this Subdivision, of which 3,408 are male and 3,204 are female. As per the 2021 Aadhaar estimates, the subdivision has a population 8,199.

Villages under Akuluto Subdivision 
Akuluto Subdivision has a total of 10 villages.

 Sumi Settsu
 Zaphumi
 Lumami
 Alaphumi
 Lumthsami
 Akuluto
 Sutemi
 Shichimi
 Lotisami (New)
 Lotisami (Old)

Climate 
Average climatic Temperature in Akuluto is 25.7°C.

Demographics 
 India census, Akuluto had a population of 11,567. Males constitute 51% of the population and females 49%. Akuluto has an average literacy rate of 81%, higher than the national average of 76%: male literacy is 81%, and female literacy is 77%.

References 

Cities and towns in Zünheboto district